Omri Gillath (born 1970) is an Israeli-American social psychologist. As a professor of social psychology at the University of Kansas, Gillath has spent over 20 years doing research, teaching psychology, and mentoring students. He is a leading figure in the field of close relationships and has over 100 publications in peer-reviewed psychology journals. His research interests include: close relationships, attachment theory, brain mechanisms and genetic polymorphisms underlying attachment style, social networks, and recently, humans connections with AI.

Career

Education 
Gillath earned his Bachelor's of Arts degree from the University of Haifa in 1997. As an undergraduate, Gillath worked in Shlomo Breznitz's Stress Lab. Between 1998 and 2003 he pursued graduate study at Bar-Ilan University working with Mario Mikulincer. He conducted postdoctoral research at the University of California, Davis, working with Phillip R. Shaver and Silvia Bunge.

After completing his postdoctoral studies at the University of California, Davis, Gillath moved to the University of Kansas where he served as an assistant professor (2006-2011), then an associate professor (2011-2016), and he currently holds the title of full professor. Gillath conducts research in social psychology and social neuroscience focusing on attachment theory (including individual differences in attachment orientation; brain mechanisms and genetic polymorphisms underlying these differences; attentional processes related to these differences; relations between the attachment, caregiving, and sexual behavioral systems as they affect adult relationships); prosocial motivation and behavior (compassion and altruism); affiliation, social networks, and friendship processes. Professor Gillath inspires enthusiasm and growth not only in his myriad of classes at the University of Kansas, but among Scholars and layperson with his lectures, publications, blogs and Ted Talk.

Awards 
Gillath has won a pair of mentoring awards, The college of liberal arts and science John C. Wright 2016 Graduate Mentor Award, and the J. Michael Young Academic Advisor Award (2009) in the Social and Behavioral Division, both from the University of Kansas.

He won research and scholarship awards including: IARR Gerald R. Miller Award for Early Career Achievement (2012),  SAGE Young Scholars Award of the Foundation for Personality and Social Psychology (2011), the Caryl Rusbult Close Relationships Early Career Award (2011) (from the Relationship Researchers Interest Group (RRIG) within the Society for Personality and Social Psychology (SPSP; 2010).

As a student, he won the Dean's Award on multiple occasions (Haifa), Excellency Scholarship (Bar-Ilan) and the UC Davis Award for Excellence in Postdoctoral Research. He also received a Dissertation research grant from the “Israel Foundation Trustees” (Ford Foundation).

Publications 
Gillath has published two books: "Relationship Science (Integrating Evolutionary, Neuroscience, and Sociocultural Approaches)" and "Adult Attachment: A Concise Introduction to Theory and Research" .

He has a blog about relationships in Psychology Today and in 2017 he participated in Overland Park TedX, delivering a talk about the power of love

Gillath has peer-reviewed many papers, but some  papers include:

Gillath, O., Ai, T., Branicky, M. S., Keshmiri, S., Davison, R. B., &amp; Spaulding, R. (2020). Attachment and trust in artificial intelligence. Computers in Human Behavior, 115, 106607.
Gillath, O., Karantzas, C. G., &amp; Selcuk, E. (2017). A Net of friends: Investigating friendship by integrating attachment theory and social network analysis. Personality and Social Psychology Bulletin, 43, 1546–1565.
Gillath, O., &amp; Keefer, L. A. (2016). Generalizing disposability: Residential mobility and the willingness to dissolve social ties. Personal Relationships, 23,186-198.
Gillath, O., Sesko, A. K., Shaver, P. R., &amp; Chun, S. D. (2010). Attachment, authenticity, and honesty: Dispositional and experimentally induced security can reduce self- and other-deception. Journal of Personality and Social Psychology, 98, 841–855.
Gillath, O., Shaver, P. R., Baek J. M., &amp; Chun, S. D. (2008). Genetic correlates of adult attachment style. Personality and Social Psychology Bulletin, 34, 1396–1405.
Gillath, O., Bunge, S. A., Shaver P. R., Wendelken, C., &amp; Mikulincer, M. (2005). Attachment-style differences in the ability to suppress negative thoughts: Exploring the neural correlates. Neuroimage, 28, 835–847.

References 

Israeli psychologists
University of Kansas faculty
Israeli expatriates in the United States
Bar-Ilan University alumni
University of Haifa alumni
1970 births
Living people